The 1977–78 FC Bayern Munich season was the club's 13th season in Bundesliga.

Review and events
Bayern Munich placed 12th in the domestic competition, its worst Bundesliga result ever. In the UEFA Cup they were defeated by Eintracht Frankfurt 6–1 on aggregate in the Round of 16. To make things even worse, Bayern were knocked out by an unheralded side Homburg in the DFB-Pokal.

Match results

Legend

Bundesliga

DFB-Pokal

UEFA Cup

First round

Second round

Third round

References

FC Bayern Munich seasons
Bayern Munich